The Nobel Memorial Prize in Economic Sciences, officially the Sveriges Riksbank Prize in Economic Sciences in Memory of Alfred Nobel, is an economics award administered by the Nobel Foundation. 

Although not one of the five Nobel Prizes established by Alfred Nobel's will in 1895, it is commonly referred to as the Nobel Prize in Economics. The winners of the Nobel Memorial Prize in Economic Sciences are chosen in a similar way, are announced along with the Nobel Prize recipients, and the prize is presented at the Nobel Prize Award Ceremony. 

The award was established in 1968 by an endowment "in perpetuity" from Sweden's central bank, Sveriges Riksbank, to commemorate the bank's 300th anniversary. It is administered and referred to along with the Nobel Prizes by the Nobel Foundation. Laureates in the Memorial Prize in Economics are selected by the Royal Swedish Academy of Sciences. It was first awarded in 1969 to Dutch economist Jan Tinbergen and Norwegian economist Ragnar Frisch "for having developed and applied dynamic models for the analysis of economic processes".

Creation and funding
An endowment "in perpetuity" from Sveriges Riksbank pays the Nobel Foundation's administrative expenses associated with the award and funds the monetary component of the award.

Since 2012, the monetary portion of the Prize in Economics has totaled 8 million Swedish kronor. This is equivalent to the amount given for the original Nobel Prizes. Since 2006, Sveriges Riksbank has given the Nobel Foundation an annual grant of 6.5 million Swedish kronor (in January 2008, approx. US$1 million; €0.7 million) for its administrative expenses associated with the award as well as 1 million Swedish kronor (until the end of 2008) to include information about the award on the Nobel Foundation's web site.

Relation to the Nobel Prizes
The Prize in Economics is not one of the Nobel Prizes endowed by Alfred Nobel in his will. However, the nomination process, selection criteria, and awards presentation of the Prize in Economic Sciences are performed in a manner similar to that of the original Nobel Prizes.

Laureates are announced with the Nobel Prize laureates, and receive the award at the same ceremony. The Royal Swedish Academy of Sciences awards the prize "in accordance with the rules governing the award of the Nobel Prizes instituted through his [Alfred Nobel's] will", which stipulate that the prize be awarded annually to "those who ... shall have conferred the greatest benefit on mankind".

Award nomination and selection process

According to its official website, the Royal Swedish Academy of Sciences "administers a researcher exchange with academies in other countries and publishes six scientific journals. Every year the Academy awards the Nobel Prizes in Physics and in Chemistry, the Sveriges Riksbank Prize in Economic Sciences in Memory of Alfred Nobel, the Crafoord Prize and a number of other large prizes".

Each September the Academy's Economics Prize Committee, which consists of five elected members, "sends invitations to thousands of scientists, members of academies and university professors in numerous countries, asking them to nominate candidates for the Prize in Economics for the coming year. Members of the Academy and former laureates are also authorised to nominate candidates." All proposals and their supporting evidence must be received before February 1. The proposals are reviewed by the Prize Committee and specially appointed experts. Before the end of September, the committee chooses potential laureates. If there is a tie, the chairman of the committee casts the deciding vote. Members of the Royal Swedish Academy of Sciences vote in mid-October to determine the next laureate or laureates of the Prize in Economics. As with the Nobel Prizes, no more than three people can share the prize for a given year; they must still be living at the time of the Prize announcement in October; and information about Prize nominations cannot be disclosed publicly for 50 years.

Like the Nobel laureates in physics, chemistry, physiology or medicine, and literature, each laureate in Economics receives a diploma, gold medal, and monetary grant award document from the King of Sweden at the annual Nobel Prize Award Ceremony in Stockholm, on the anniversary of Nobel's death (December 10).

Laureates

The first prize in economics was awarded in 1969 to Ragnar Frisch and Jan Tinbergen "for having developed and applied dynamic models for the analysis of economic processes". Two women have received the prize: Elinor Ostrom, who won in 2009, and Esther Duflo, who won in 2019.

Awards to non-economists
In February 1995, following acrimony within the selection committee pertaining to the awarding of the 1994 Prize in Economics to John Forbes Nash, the Prize in Economics was redefined as a prize in social sciences. This made it available to researchers in such topics as political science, psychology, and sociology. Moreover, the composition of the Economics Prize Committee changed to include two non-economists. This has not been confirmed by the Economics Prize Committee. The members of the 2007 Economics Prize Committee are still dominated by economists, as the secretary and four of the five members are professors of economics. In 1978, Herbert A. Simon, whose PhD was in political science, became the first non-economist to win the prize, while Daniel Kahneman, a professor of psychology and public affairs at Princeton University is the first non-economist by profession to win the prize.

Controversies and criticisms
Some critics argue that the prestige of the Prize in Economics derives in part from its association with the Nobel Prizes, an association that has often been a source of controversy. Among them is the Swedish human rights lawyer Peter Nobel, a great-grandnephew of Ludvig Nobel. Nobel accuses the awarding institution of misusing his family's name, and states that no member of the Nobel family has ever had the intention of establishing a prize in economics. He explained that "Nobel despised people who cared more about profits than society's well-being", saying that "There is nothing to indicate that he would have wanted such a prize", and that the association with the Nobel prizes is "a PR coup by economists to improve their reputation".

According to Samuel Brittan of the Financial Times, both former Swedish minister of finance (Kjell-Olof Feldt) and Swedish former minister of commerce (Gunnar Myrdal) wanted the prize abolished, saying, "Myrdal rather less graciously wanted the prize abolished because it had been given to such reactionaries as Hayek (and afterwards Milton Friedman)." Relatedly, it has been noted that several members of the awarding committee have been affiliated with the Mont Pelerin Society.

In his speech at the 1974 Nobel Prize banquet, Friedrich Hayek stated that had he been consulted on the establishment of a Nobel Prize in economics, he would "have decidedly advised against it" primarily because, "The Nobel Prize confers on an individual an authority which in economics no man ought to possess. ... This does not matter in the natural sciences. Here the influence exercised by an individual is chiefly an influence on his fellow experts; and they will soon cut him down to size if he exceeds his competence. But the influence of the economist that mainly matters is an influence over laymen: politicians, journalists, civil servants and the public generally."

Critics cite the apparent snub of Joan Robinson as evidence of the committee's bias towards mainstream economics, though heterodox economists like Friedrich Hayek (Austrian School) and Ronald Coase (associated with new institutional economics) have won.

Milton Friedman was awarded the 1976 prize in part for his work on monetarism. Awarding the prize to Friedman caused international protests. Friedman was accused of supporting the military dictatorship in Chile because of the relation of economists of the University of Chicago to Pinochet, and a controversial six-day trip he took to Chile during March 1975 (less than two years after the coup that deposed President Salvador Allende). Friedman himself answered that he never was an adviser to the dictatorship, but only gave some lectures and seminars on inflation and met with officials, including Augusto Pinochet, in Chile.

Four Nobel Prize laureatesGeorge Wald, Linus Pauling, David Baltimore and Salvador Luriawrote letters in October 1976 to The New York Times protesting Friedman's award.

The 1994 prize to John Forbes Nash caused controversy within the selection committee because of Nash's history of mental illness and alleged anti-Semitism. The controversy resulted in a change to the rules governing the committee during 1994: Prize Committee members are now limited to serve for three years.

The 2005 prize to Robert Aumann was criticized by the European press for his alleged use of game theory to justify his stance against the dismantling of Israeli settlements in occupied territories.

Alternative names
The award's official Swedish name is Sveriges riksbanks pris i ekonomisk vetenskap till Alfred Nobels minne. The Nobel Foundation's translations of the Swedish name into English have varied since 1969:

See also
 List of economics awards
 List of Nobel laureates by country
 List of prizes known as the Nobel of a field
 List of prizes named after people

Citations

General references

External links

 The Sveriges Riksbank Prize in Economic Sciences in Memory of Alfred Nobel on Sveriges Riksbank's web site.
 The Sveriges Riksbank Prize in Economic Sciences in Memory of Alfred Nobel on the web site of the Royal Swedish Academy of Sciences.
 The Sveriges Riksbank Prize in Economic Sciences in Memory of Alfred Nobel on the Nobel Foundation's web site.
 IDEAS/RePEc.
 Nobel Perspectives website – documentary interviews with past laureates of the Nobel Prize for Economics.

 
1969 establishments in Sweden
1969 in economics
Economics
Awards established in 1969
Economics
Economics awards